Gerhard Oppitz (born 5 February 1953, Frauenau) is a German classical pianist.

He studied with Paul Buck, Hugo Steurer and Wilhelm Kempff. In 1981 he was appointed professor at the Hochschule für Musik und Theater Münchenthe youngest in the history of the institutewhere he still teaches. As a soloist he has appeared with many famous conductors and orchestras of the world. In the summer 1977, at the age of 24, Oppitz was the first German to win the Arthur Rubinstein International Piano Master Competition in Tel Aviv, Israel.

Performance of cycles of complete piano works feature strongly in his concert repertoire, including Schubert's and Grieg's solo piano works and the sonatas by Beethoven and Mozart's sonatas and, especially, the complete works of Johannes Brahms. He has recorded the challenging Max Reger Piano Concerto, Op. 114, with the Bamberg Symphony Orchestra and conductor Horst Stein.

In 2009 he received the Brahms-Preis from the Brahms Society of Schleswig-Holstein.

Among his students are Valentina Babor and Milana Chernyavska.

References

External links
 
 Gerhard Oppitz (Piano) bach-cantatas.com
 Biography on Boston Symphony Orchestra page, accessed 21 October 2011
 Interview for Tokafi, accessed 21 October 2011

1953 births
Living people
University of Music and Performing Arts Munich alumni
Academic staff of the University of Music and Performing Arts Munich
German classical pianists
Male classical pianists
21st-century classical pianists
21st-century male musicians